Lexington Christian Academy can refer to any of several schools:
Lexington Christian Academy (Kentucky)
Lexington Christian Academy (Massachusetts)